Randriamananjara Radofa Besata Jean Longin (born October 31, 1956 in Antananarivo, Madagascar) is a Canadian-Malagasy folk and blues guitarist, who records and performs under the stage name Madagascar Slim. He is a member of the folk music band Tri-Continental and the world music group African Guitar Summit, as well as a solo artist and a regular collaborator with blues singer Ndidi Onukwulu.

He moved to Canada in 1979 to study English and accounting at Seneca College, pursuing music with the folk group La Ridaine while studying. He has cited Jimi Hendrix and B. B. King as the two primary influences on his choice to become a guitarist.

He is a three-time Juno Award winner, having won World Music Album of the Year in 2000 for his solo album Omnisource and in 2005 with African Guitar Summit, and Roots & Traditional Album of the Year in 2001 with Tri-Continental.

Discography
 2000 OmniSource
 2009 Good Life Good Living

With Tri-Continental
 2000 Tri-Continental
 2002 Live
 2003 Let's Play
 2004 Drifting
 2018 Dust Dance

With Other Artists
 2005  African Guitar Summit
 2006  African Guitar Summit II

References

External links
 Autobiographical description by Madagascar Slim
 

1956 births
Living people
People from Antananarivo
Malagasy guitarists
Canadian folk guitarists
Canadian blues guitarists
Canadian male guitarists
Black Canadian musicians
Canadian world music musicians
Juno Award for Global Music Album of the Year winners
Seneca College alumni